California's 15th district may refer to:

 California's 15th congressional district
 California's 15th State Assembly district
 California's 15th State Senate district